is a passenger railway station located in Chūō-ku, Chiba, Japan, operated by East Japan Railway Company (JR East).

Lines
Nishi-Chiba Station is served by the Chūō-Sōbu Line and is located 1.4 kilometers from Chiba Station and 37.8 kilometers from the starting point of the line at Tokyo Station.

Station layout
The station consists of an island platform serving two tracks with ab elevated station building located above the platform and tracks.  The station is staffed. There are also two express tracks north of track 2; these are used by rapid Sōbu Main Line trains that pass through the station non-stop.

Platforms

History
The station opened on October 1, 1942. The station was absorbed into the JR East network upon the privatization of the Japan National Railways (JNR) on April 1, 1987.

Passenger statistics
In fiscal 2019, the station was used by an average of 22,000 passengers daily (boarding passengers only).

Surrounding area
Chiba University Nishi-Chiba campus 
 University of Tokyo Institute of Industrial Science Chiba campus 
 Chiba Keizai University
 Keiai University
 Chiba Prefectural Chiba Commerce High school
 Chiba Prefectural Chiba-Higashi High school

References

External links

 JR East Nishi-Chiba Station 

Railway stations in Chiba Prefecture
Railway stations in Japan opened in 1942
Railway stations in Chiba (city)
Chūō-Sōbu Line